Tons of Money may refer to:

 Tons of Money (play), a 1922 comic play by the British writer Will Evans
 Tons of Money (1924 film), a British silent film adaptation
 Tons of Money (1930 film), a British sound remake